The Arcadia quadrangle is one of a series of 30 quadrangle maps of Mars used by the United States Geological Survey (USGS) Astrogeology Research Program. The quadrangle is located in the north-central portion of Mars’ western hemisphere and covers 240° to 300° east longitude (60° to 120° west longitude) and 30° to 65° north latitude. The quadrangle uses a Lambert conformal conic projection at a nominal scale of 1:5,000,000 (1:5M). The Arcadia quadrangle is also referred to as MC-3 (Mars Chart-3).

The southern and northern borders of the Arcadia quadrangle are approximately 3,065 km and 1,500 km wide, respectively. The north to south distance is about 2,050 km (slightly less than the length of Greenland). The quadrangle covers an approximate area of 4.9 million square km, or a little over 3% of Mars’ surface area.  The region called Tempe Terra is in the Arcadia quadrangle.

Several features found in this quadrangle are interesting, especially gullies which are believed to be caused by relatively recent flows of liquid water.  Dark slope streaks and dust devil tracks can have a striking appearance.

Origin of name
Arcadia is the name of a telescopic albedo feature located at 45° north latitude (N) and 260° east longitude (E) on Mars. The feature was named after a mountainous region in southern Greece.  The name was approved by the International Astronomical Union(IAU) in 1958.

Physiography and geology
The quadrangle contains Alba Patera, the largest volcano (by area and volume) in the Solar System, Mareotis Fossae and Tempe as well as Tempe Terra, a highly fractured block of ancient crust about the size of Alaska.

Fossa
Large troughs (long narrow depressions) are called fossae in the geographical language used for Mars. This term is derived from Latin; therefore fossa is singular and fossae are plural. These troughs form when the crust is stretched until it breaks.  The stretching can be due to the large weight of a nearby volcano.  Fossae/pit craters are common near volcanoes in the Tharsis and Elysium system of volcanoes.  A trough often has two breaks with a middle section moving down, leaving steep cliffs along the sides; such a trough is called a graben.  Lake George, in northern New York State, is a lake that sits in a graben. Pit craters are often associated with graben. Pit craters do not have rims or ejecta around them, like impact craters do.  Studies have found that on Mars a fault may be as deep as 5 km, that is the break in the rock goes down to 5 km.  Moreover, the crack or fault sometimes widens or dilates.  This widening causes a void to form with a relatively high volume.  When surface material slides into the void, a pit crater or a pit crater chain forms.  On Mars, individual pit craters can join to form chains or even to form troughs that are sometimes scalloped.  Other ideas have been suggested for the formation of fossae and pit craters.  There is evidence that they are associated with dikes of magma.  Magma might move along, under the surface, breaking the rock and more importantly melting ice.  The resulting action would cause a crack to form at the surface.  Pit craters are not common on Earth.  Sinkholes, where the ground falls into a hole (sometimes in the middle of a town) resemble pit craters on Mars. On Earth these holes are caused by limestone being dissolved, thereby causing a void.

Knowledge of the locations and formation mechanisms of pit craters and fossae is important for the future colonization of Mars because they may be reservoirs of water.  Many grabens are found in the Arcadia quadrangle.  Pictures below show examples of grabens in Arcadia.

Dust devil tracks 
Many areas on Mars, including the Arcadia quadrangle, experience the passage of giant dust devils.  A thin coating of fine bright dust covers most of the Martian surface.  When a dust devil passes it blows away the coating and exposes the underlying dark surface.  Dust devils have been seen from the ground and from orbit.  They have blown dust from the solar panels of the two Rovers on Mars, thereby greatly extending their lives.  The twin Rovers were designed to last for three months, instead they lasted more than six years.  The first rover, Spirit, was last heard from in March 2010. Opportunity continued to explore Mars for over 14 years, and its mission was ended in August, 2018. The pattern of the tracks were shown to change every few months.  The image below from HiRISE shows some dust devil tracks in the shape of X's, and can be clicked for a larger view to see the tracks clearly.

Dark slope streaks 
Many places on Mars show dark streaks on steep slopes like crater walls.  It seems that the youngest streaks are dark; then they become lighter with age.  Often they begin as a small narrow spot then widen and extend downhill for hundreds of meters.  They have been seen to travel around obstacles, like boulders. 
Several ideas have been advanced to explain the streaks.  Some involve water or even the growth of organisms. 
  It is most generally accepted that they represent avalanches of dust.  The streaks appear in areas covered with dust.  When a thin layer of dust is removed, the underlying surface is dark.  Much of the Martian surface is covered with dust.  Fine dust settles out of the atmosphere covering everything. Much is known about this dust because the solar panels of the Mars rovers get covered with dust, thus reducing the electrical energy.  The power of the rovers has been restored many times by the wind, in the form of dust devils, cleaning the panels and boosting the power. 
Dust storms are frequent, especially when the spring season begins in the southern hemisphere.  At that time, Mars is 40% closer to the Sun. The orbit of Mars is much more elliptical than Earth's. The difference between the farthest point from the Sun and the closest point to the Sun is very great for Mars, but only a slight amount for Earth.  Also, every few years, the entire planet is engulfed in a global dust storm.  When NASA's Mariner 9 craft arrived, nothing could be seen through the dust storm. Other global dust storms have also been observed since then.

Research, published in January 2012 in Icarus, found that dark streaks were initiated by airblasts from meteorites traveling at supersonic speeds. The team of scientists was led by Kaylan Burleigh, an undergraduate at the University of Arizona. After counting some 65,000 dark streaks around the impact site of a group of 5 new craters, patterns emerged. The number of streaks was greatest closer to the impact site.  So, the impact somehow probably caused the streaks. Also, the distribution of the streaks formed a pattern with two wings extending from the impact site. The curved wings resembled scimitars, curved knives.  This pattern suggests that an interaction of airblasts from the group of meteorites shook dust loose enough to start dust avalanches that formed the many dark streaks.  At first it was thought that the shaking of the ground from the impact caused the dust avalanches, but if that was the case the dark streaks would have been arranged symmetrically around the impacts, rather than being concentrated into curved shapes.  Dark streaks can be seen in the image below of Tractus Catena that was taken by HiRISE.

Martian gullies

The Arcadia quadrangle is the location of gullies that may be due to recent flowing water. Gullies occur on steep slopes, especially on the walls of craters. Gullies are believed to be relatively young because they have few, if any craters. Moreover, they lie on top of sand dunes which themselves are considered to be quite young. Usually, each gully has an alcove, channel, and apron. Some studies have found that gullies occur on slopes that face all directions, others have found that the greater number of gullies are found on poleward facing slopes, especially from 30 to 44 S.

Although many ideas have been put forward to explain them, the most popular involve liquid water coming from an aquifer, from melting at the base of old glaciers, or from the melting of ice in the ground when the climate was warmer. Because liquid water mayu have been involved in their formation, and that they could be very young, some scientists look to the gullies to search for signs of past life.

There is evidence for all three theories. Most of the gully alcove heads occur at the same level, just as one would expect of an aquifer. Various measurements and calculations show that liquid water could exist in aquifers at the usual depths where gullies begin. One variation of this model is that rising hot magma could have melted ice in the ground and caused water to flow in aquifers. Aquifers are layer that allow water to flow. They may consist of porous sandstone. The aquifer layer would be perched on top of another layer that prevents water from going down (in geological terms it would be called impermeable). Because water in an aquifer is prevented from going down, the only direction the trapped water can flow is horizontally. Eventually, water could flow out onto the surface when the aquifer reaches a break—like a crater wall. The resulting flow of water could erode the wall to create gullies. Aquifers are quite common on Earth. A good example is "Weeping Rock" in Zion National Park Utah.

As for the next theory, much of the surface of Mars is covered by a thick smooth mantle that is thought to be a mixture of ice and dust. This ice-rich mantle, a few yards thick, smooths the land, but in places it has a bumpy texture, resembling the surface of a basketball. The mantle may be like a glacier and under certain conditions the ice that is mixed in the mantle could melt and flow down the slopes and make gullies.  Because there are few craters on this mantle, the mantle is relatively young. An excellent view of this mantle is shown below in the picture of the Ptolemaeus Crater Rim, as seen by HiRISE.
The ice-rich mantle may be the result of climate changes. Changes in Mars's orbit and tilt cause significant changes in the distribution of water ice from polar regions down to latitudes equivalent to Texas. During certain climate periods water vapor leaves polar ice and enters the atmosphere. The water comes back to ground at lower latitudes as deposits of frost or snow mixed generously with dust. The atmosphere of Mars contains a great deal of fine dust particles. Water vapor will condense on the particles, then fall down to the ground due to the additional weight of the water coating. When Mars is at its greatest tilt or obliquity, up to 2 cm of ice could be removed from the summer ice cap and deposited at midlatitudes. This movement of water could last for several thousand years and create a snow layer of up to around 10 meters thick. When ice at the top of the mantling layer goes back into the atmosphere, it leaves behind dust, which insulating the remaining ice.  Measurements of altitudes and slopes of gullies support the idea that snowpacks or glaciers are associated with gullies.  Steeper slopes have more shade which would preserve snow.
Higher elevations have far fewer gullies because ice would tend to sublimate more in the thin air of the higher altitude.

The third theory might be possible since climate changes may be enough to simply allow ice in the ground to melt and thus form the gullies. During a warmer climate, the first few meters of ground could thaw and produce a "debris flow" similar to those on Greenland's east coast. Since the gullies occur on steep slopes only a small decrease of the shear strength of the soil particles is needed to begin the flow. Small amounts of liquid water from melted ground ice could be enough.  Calculations show that a third of a mm of runoff can be produced each day for 50 days of each Martian year, even under current conditions.

Latitude dependent mantle

Much of the surface of Mars is covered by a thick smooth mantle that is thought to be a mixture of ice and dust.  This ice-rich mantle, a few yards thick, makes the surface look very smooth. Because there are few craters on this mantle, the mantle is relatively young.

Changes in Mars's orbit and tilt cause significant changes in the distribution of water ice from polar regions down to latitudes equivalent to Texas.  During certain climate periods water vapor leaves polar ice and enters the atmosphere. The water returns to the ground at lower latitudes as deposits of frost or snow mixed generously with dust. The atmosphere of Mars contains a great deal of fine dust particles.  Water vapor condenses on the particles, and then they fall down to the ground due to the additional weight of the water coating.  When ice at the top of the mantling layer goes back into the atmosphere, it leaves behind dust, which insulates the remaining ice.

Glacial features

Glaciers, loosely defined as patches of currently or recently flowing ice, are thought to be present across large but restricted areas of the modern Martian surface, and are inferred to have been more widely distributed at times in the past. Lobate convex features on the surface known as viscous flow features and lobate debris aprons, which show the characteristics of non-Newtonian flow, are now almost unanimously regarded as true glaciers.

Channels
Many places on Mars show channels of different sizes.  Many of these channels probably carried water for a time.  The climate of Mars may have been such in the past that water ran on its surface.  It has been known for some time that Mars undergoes many large changes in its tilt or obliquity because its two small moons lack the gravity to stabilize it, as the Moon stabilizes Earth; at times the tilt of Mars has even been greater than 80 degrees

Tilted layers
Tilted layers along slopes, especially along crater walls are believed to be the remains of a once wide spread material that has mostly been eroded away.

Linear ridge networks
Linear ridge networks are found in various places on Mars in and around craters.   These features have also been called "polygonal ridge networks," "boxwork ridges", and "reticulate ridges."  Ridges often appear as mostly straight segments that intersect in a lattice-like manner.  They are hundreds of meters long, tens of meters high, and several meters wide.  It is thought that impacts created fractures in the surface, these fractures later acted as channels for fluids.  Fluids cemented the structures.  With the passage of time, surrounding material was eroded away, thereby leaving hard ridges behind.

Layers
Many places on Mars show rocks arranged in layers. Rock can form layers in a variety of ways.  Volcanoes, wind, or water can produce layers.
A detailed discussion of layering with many Martian examples can be found in Sedimentary Geology of Mars.

Other Features in the Arcadia quadrangle

Other Mars quadrangles

Interactive Mars map

See also 

 Dark slope streak
 Dust Devil Tracks
 Fossa (geology)
 Fretted terrain 
 Glaciers on Mars
 HiRISE
 HiWish program
 Impact crater
 Linear ridge networks
 Lobate debris apron
 Martian Gullies
 Perepelkin (Martian crater)

References

External links 

 
Mars